Jianhe Township is a place in Qiandongnan Miao and Dong Autonomous Prefecture, Guizhou province, China.

Cities in Guizhou